Just before each crus of the penis meets its fellow, it presents a slight enlargement, which Georg Ludwig Kobelt named the bulb of the corpus cavernosum penis. The bulb of penis is also known as the urethral bulb.

The bulb is homologous to the vestibular bulbs in females.

Additional images

References

External links
 
 

Mammal male reproductive system
Human penis anatomy